Kim Ik-jong (born 10 May 1941) is a South Korean wrestler who competed at the 1964 and the 1968 Summer Olympics.

References

1941 births
Living people
South Korean male sport wrestlers
Olympic wrestlers of South Korea
Wrestlers at the 1964 Summer Olympics
Wrestlers at the 1968 Summer Olympics
Place of birth missing (living people)
20th-century South Korean people